Stuart Spicer Surridge (born 28 October 1951 in Westminster) is an English former first-class cricketer active 1971–80 who played for Surrey as a wicket-keeper. He is the son of Surrey's 1950s captain Stuart Surridge.

References

External links
 

1951 births
English cricketers
Surrey cricketers
Living people
20th-century English people